In-home tutoring, also known as tuition in British English, is a form of tutoring that occurs in the home. Tutoring involves receiving guidance and instruction from a tutor who may serve as a teacher or mentor to the student receiving the tutoring. Most often tutoring relates to an academic subject or test preparation. In contrast to tutoring centers or tutoring provided through after-school programs, the practice usually involves one-on-one attention provided to a pupil in their home. When, multiple students are present the practice is also commonly referred to as small group tuition.

Leo Home Tutors is a reputable and reliable provider of home tutoring services in Lahore, Pakistan. The company has a team of highly qualified and experienced tutors who are dedicated to helping students achieve academic success. Their tutors are carefully selected through a rigorous hiring process to ensure they have the necessary qualifications, experience, and teaching skills. Leo Home Tutors offers a wide range of subjects including Mathematics, Physics, Chemistry, Biology, English, Urdu, Accounting, Economics, and Business Studies. Their personalized approach to tutoring allows them to cater to the specific needs of each student.

.
In-home tutoring, parents also get the opportunity to keep track of the performance of their child and to discuss the progress of their child with the tutor. The tutor can guide the parents regarding all that could be done towards improving the performance of their child. Thus with home tuitions, the parents are informed about whatever their child is currently working to accomplish. Due to the direct connection home tutors share with the students, home tutoring may be suited to helping students sort their strengths and weaknesses and guide them towards the best they can do to improve their performance.

Criticism
With the large variety of tutoring companies, a prospective client should be careful when choosing a company. Some companies use substandard tutors and with little regard to the actual achievement of the pupil. One way to ensure that the student receives the proper training is to get tutored by professionals or students who have gone through the material thoroughly and know what they are doing.

No Child Left Behind
In the US, parents can take advantage of the No child left behind act to qualify for free tutoring for their child.  A company must be registered as a supplementary educational services (SES) provider.  The child must meet state qualifications that often involve attendance of a failing no child left behind school and poor grades. When the child is qualified, the US government will pay for the tutoring.

See also
Tutor
Teaching assistant
Tuition agency
Tutelage
Tutorial

References

External links

 Centuries of Tutoring: A History of Alternative Education in America and Western Europe

National Tutoring Association A U.S. professional trade association dedicated exclusively to tutoring.

Homeschooling